Marianne Devaux (born October 27, 1962 in Nouméa) is a New Caledonian politician. She has served in the Congress of New Caledonia as a member of The Rally-UMP.

References

1962 births
Living people
People from Nouméa
Members of the Congress of New Caledonia
The Rally (New Caledonia) politicians